Tibioscarites is a genus of beetles in the family Carabidae, containing the following species:

 Tibioscarites excisomandibularis Banninger, 1929
 Tibioscarites uluguruanus Basilewsky, 1976

References

Scaritinae